Louis Kahan AO (25 May 190516 July 2002) was an Austrian-born Australian artist whose long career included fashion design, illustration for magazines and journals, painting, printmaking and drawing. He is represented in most major collections in Australia as well as in Europe and USA. He won the Archibald Prize in 1962 with a portrait of Patrick White.

Biography
Louis Kahan was born in Vienna on 25 May 1905 and initially trained as a tailor with his father. However, he was particularly drawn to art and as a young man sketched his father's clients, who included famous actors and musicians of the day.  In 1925 he travelled from Vienna to Paris where he worked with renowned couturier Paul Poiret, first as a tailor and then designer. Through Poiret he met many artists, including Matisse, Dufy and Vlaminck. He designed costumes for Josephine Baker, Collette and the Follies Bergeres. He immersed himself in the bohemian life of the city and began life drawing in Montparnasse. At this time he also produced freelance illustrations for newspapers and magazines.

He enlisted in the French Foreign Legion in 1939 and was sent to Algeria, North Africa as a war artist, although he had never received any formal art training. He had an exhibition at Oran in 1942. He was a voluntary artist for the Red Cross between 1943 and 1945. During this time, photography of soldiers was not permitted. Louis made over 2,000 drawings of wounded soldiers being cared for in the hospital at Oran and these were v-mailed (an early form of microfilm) to the families of soldiers. When he found that the originals were being destroyed after transmission Kahan began to save them and over 300 were later given by him to the Red Cross Museum in Washington, USA.

He returned to Paris after the war, and was employed by Le Figaro to sketch the court scenes of the war trials.

After travelling across the United States he moved to Perth, Western Australia to join his family, who had emigrated to Australia before the war. In Perth he had his first solo exhibition and began to be recognized by the art world, with work purchased by the Art Gallery of Western Australia.

He moved to Melbourne in 1950 where his talent for portraiture was recognized by Melbourne Herald art critic, Alan McCulloch, who introduced him to Clem Christesen, editor of Meanjin. He made many portraits of Australian and other celebrities, including Geoffrey Blainey, Judy Cassab, Manning Clark, Arthur Boyd, Dame Joan Sutherland, Yehudi Menuhin and Luciano Pavarotti. Many of the original drawings for Meanjin are now in the Baillieu Collection of Melbourne University.

On a return trip to Perth in 1953 he met and married Lily. After living in London for some time they returned to Australia in 1959 and then to Melbourne in 1960. Here he collaborated with producer Stephen Haag, designing sets and costumes for opera and theatre. The Victorian Art Centre, Melbourne, has a large collection of his portraits of musicians, and set and costume designs.

In his paintings, prints and drawings Louis Kahan explored many interests and themes, including dreams, death, and his own life. Childhood games, portraits and nudes were ongoing subjects. Symbolism particularly characterises his later works. Later, dreamlike prints and paintings often show Kahan's tools of the trade: palette, brushes, tailor's scissors and tape. These represent a kind of metaphorical self-portrait and life history.

In 1993 Louis Kahan was appointed an Officer of the Order of Australia for service to the arts.

He died in 2002, aged 97.

References

External links
Artwork and Biography
Jewish museum
The official Louis Kahan website
Louis Kahan at Australian Art
Design and Art Australia Online (DAAO)
Louis Kahan Collection at RMIT Design Archives

1905 births
2002 deaths
20th-century Australian painters
20th-century Australian male artists
Archibald Prize winners
Australian Jews
Australian people of Austrian-Jewish descent
Jewish painters
Officers of the Order of Australia
Soldiers of the French Foreign Legion
Alumni of the Académie de la Grande Chaumière
Australian printmakers
Austrian emigrants to Australia
Austrian Jews
20th-century printmakers
Meanjin people
Australian male painters